Maria Feklistova (born May 12, 1976) is a Russian sport shooter and Olympic medalist. She won a bronze medal in women's 50 metre rifle three positions at the 2000 Summer Olympics in Sydney.

References

External links

1976 births
Living people
Russian female sport shooters
ISSF rifle shooters
Shooters at the 2000 Summer Olympics
Olympic shooters of Russia
Olympic bronze medalists for Russia
Olympic medalists in shooting
Medalists at the 2000 Summer Olympics